The Fighting Lover is a 1921 American silent mystery comedy film directed by Fred LeRoy Granville and starring Frank Mayo, Elinor Hancock and Gertrude Olmstead.

Cast
 Frank Mayo as Andrew Forsdale
 Elinor Hancock as 	Mrs. Lydia Graham
 Gertrude Olmstead as Jean Forsdale
 Jackson Read as Ned Randolph
 Colin Kenny as Vic Ragner
Jacqueline Logan as Helen Leigh
 Joseph Singleton as Quig Munday
 Ruth Ashby as Anna Hughes
 Fred Becker as Dr. Munro 
 Robert Bolder as 	Valet

References

Bibliography
 Connelly, Robert B. The Silents: Silent Feature Films, 1910-36, Volume 40, Issue 2. December Press, 1998.
 Munden, Kenneth White. The American Film Institute Catalog of Motion Pictures Produced in the United States, Part 1. University of California Press, 1997.

External links
 

1921 films
1921 mystery films
1921 comedy films
1920s English-language films
American silent feature films
1920s comedy mystery films
American comedy mystery films
Films directed by Fred LeRoy Granville
American black-and-white films
Universal Pictures films
1920s American films
Silent American comedy films
Silent comedy mystery films